The Community First Champion Center is a  indoor sports center in Grand Chute, in the U.S. state of Wisconsin. The facility is primarily intended to be used for youth sports/community sporting activities and as of early 2019 is not planned to house a professional sports team.

The sports center was expected to cost $30 million to build. The cost of construction was provided by a 3% hotel-room tax being charged throughout the Fox Cities region; this tax was also used to pay for the Fox Cities Exhibition Center. It is expected to contribute around $8–12 million the Fox Cities economy, one of the fast-growing regions in the United States.

Location and design
The new arena broke ground on September 18, 2018. It opened in November 2019.

The Center has 3 separate arena spaces with one being permanently set up with an ice rink and another 2 multi-purpose arenas which could handle court sports, concerts, or additional ice rinks. The total capacity of all 3 arenas is expected to be between 3 and 4 thousand.

History
On January 23, 2019, the Center was the target of vandalism by a group of teenagers who also damaged other construction sites around the area as well as starting fires in elevators within parking ramps in downtown Appleton. The damage to the center was expected to cost over $1 million.

On March 22, 2019, the Town of Grand Chute announced that the naming rights for the center were bought by Community First Credit Union; terms of the deal have not been released.

References

External links
 

2019 establishments in Wisconsin
Indoor arenas in Wisconsin
Sports venues in Wisconsin
Tourist attractions in Outagamie County, Wisconsin